"Go Like Elijah" is a 1973 song by Chi Coltrane. It was a number one hit in the Netherlands at the time. It stayed in the Dutch Top 40 for one month. In the Netherlands it was released with "It's Really Come to This" as its B-side.

The song can be found on her album Chi Coltrane (1973).

Lyrics

The lyrics describe how the singer wants to rise up to Heaven after her death in the same manner as the biblical prophet Elijah who, according to a Bible passage, was lifted up in the sky by a chariot pulled by fiery horses. The song is notable for its gospel arrangement and turning the subject of death into a celebration. In an interview Coltrane explained that she did not set out to write the song as a gospel tune, but first and foremost as her true expressions about death.

Charts

References

Chi Coltrane songs
Gospel songs
1973 singles
1973 songs
Songs based on the Bible
Dutch Top 40 number-one singles